General Rodolph John Leslie Hibernicus De Salis (9 May 1811 - 13 March 1880), CB, OBE, Légion d'honneur, and Order of Medjidie was a soldier who fought at many major battles during the nineteenth century.

Early life and education
Second son of Jerome, 4th Count de Salis-Soglio, he was educated at Eton College, Heidelberg University and Oriel College, Oxford.

Career
Cornet, 17 December 1830; Lieutenant, 28 June 1833; Captain, 13 July 1838; Major, 19 February 1847; Brevet Lt. Colonel, 28 November 1854; Lt. Colonel, 2 October 1856; Colonel, 20 March 1858. He fought at Alma, Inkerman, Balaclava, Tchernaya, Kertch, Sebastopol, Central India (& Rajpootana), Kotah ki Serai, Sindwaho, Delhi, Koondrye, Chundaree, Gwalior, and Boordah.

Marriage
He married in Paris, 8 November 1875, Augusta Letitia Robinson, of 10 Marble Arch, London, (1839–1929), (widow of General Adolfus Derville, (1801–1874), Indian Army.

References and Notes
Forgotten Heroes: The Charge of the Light Brigade, by Roy Dutton, 2007.

1811 births
1880 deaths
People educated at Eton College
Alumni of Oriel College, Oxford
Rodolphus
Military personnel from London
People from Hillingdon
8th King's Royal Irish Hussars officers
British Army generals
British Army personnel of the Crimean War
Recipients of the Legion of Honour
19th-century Anglo-Irish people
People from Dunleer
British military personnel of the Indian Rebellion of 1857